The following lists of animation studios presents current and former organizations similar to artists studios but principally dedicated to the production and distribution of animated films. Such studios may be actual production facilities or corporate entities. The countries with the most listed, active studios, are Japan, United States, Canada, United Kingdom and South Korea, but studios are found across all continents.

Active studios

Defunct studios

See also

 List of Japanese animation studios
 List of animation distribution companies
 Film genre
 Motion graphic design

References

Animation studios, List of
Animation studios